Former pupils of George Watson's College in Edinburgh are known as Watsonians, in memory of the school's founder, George Watson. They include the following individuals. See also The Category for Watsonians.

Notable alumni

 The Reverend David Arnott, Moderator of the General Assembly of the Church of Scotland for 2011–201
 Robert Horne, 1st Viscount Horne, Chancellor of the Exchequer
 Paul Nuki Chief Editor at NHS Choices.

Culture

Actors and dramatists
 James Finlayson, actor
 Peter Baikie, Scottish comedian and composer
 Jack Docherty, Scottish writer, actor, presenter and producer
 Jamie Drummond, Edinburgh-born Canadian sommelier and amateur dramatist
 Gordon Kennedy, actor

Architects
 Basil Spence, architect
 William Kininmonth (architect)
 James Craig (architect)
 Alexander Lorne Campbell
 Gareth Hoskins

Artists
 Douglas Percy Bliss, painter
 Henry Raeburn Dobson, painter

Music
 Ian Anderson, musician with Jethro Tull
 Robin Williamson, musician with The Incredible String Band
 Donald Runnicles, conductor
 Malcolm Martineau, pianist and recital accompanist
 Myles MacInnes (known as Mylo), singer-songwriter, music producer, and DJ
 Keith McIvor (known as JD Twitch) music producer, and DJ

Writers – Poets, novelists, dramatists
 David Daiches, Scottish literary historian and literary critic
 Christopher John Sansom, best-selling novelist
 Rebecca West, writer and campaigner

Journalists
 Karin Giannone, Journalist and news presenter at BBC News
 Sheena McDonald, Broadcaster and journalist
 Martha Kearney, BBC broadcaster and journalist
 Hugo Rifkind, journalist
 Iain Macwhirter, journalist

Lawyers and Judges
 Robert Brown (Robin) Black, GCMG, Governor of Hong Kong, 1958–64
 Colin Boyd, Baron Boyd of Duncansby, PC, QC, Lord Advocate, life peer in the British House of Lords
 John Corrie, politician, MP, MEP
 David Maxwell Fyfe, Viscount Kilmuir, Barrister, Home Secretary and Lord Chancellor
 Frances Guy Diplomat (British Ambassador to the Yemen and Lebanon)
Donald Mackay, Baron Mackay of Drumadoon
 Ronald King Murray, Lord Murray, PC, politician and judge, (Labour Party)
 Robert Reed, Lord Reed, Supreme Court of the United Kingdom
 Iain Macphail, Lord Macphail
 Alastair Campbell, Lord Bracadale, QC
 John Ireland Falconer, WS
 Tun Dato' Sir James Beveridge Thomson, KBE, SSM, PMN, PJK, lawyer and judge, Chief Justice of the Federal Court of Malaysia.
 John Charles Fenton, lawyer, Solicitor General for Scotland

Military
 Air Chief Marshal Sir James Robb (RAF officer), GCB, KBE, DSO, DFC, AFC
 Rear Admiral George Pirie Thomson, CBE, naval officer and Britain's Chief Press Censor in WWII
 Lieutenant General Sir David Young (British Army officer), KBE, CB, DFC
 Major-General Sir Alexander Biggam, KBE, CB, FRSE, FRCPE, FRCP
 Captain Henry Peel Ritchie, First World War Victoria Cross recipient

Politics
 Malcolm Chisholm
 Iain Gray, MSP, former leader of Scottish Labour
 Ronald King Murray, Lord Murray, PC, politician and judge, (Labour Party)
 Malcolm Rifkind, KCMG, QC, politician (Conservative Party)
 Chris Smith, Baron Smith of Finsbury, PC, former British MP and Cabinet minister (Labour Party)
 Liz Smith, MSP
 David Steel, Baron Steel of Aikwood, KT, KBE, PC, politician (Liberal Democrats), MP, former leader of the Liberal Party
 William Wolfe
 Auckland Geddes, 1st Baron Geddes, GCMG, KCB, PC
 Rebecca West, feminist campaigner
 Robin Gray, (New Zealand MP, speaker of House of Representatives)

Science and academia
 Sir Eric Anderson, KT, FRSE, provost of Eton College
 Prof William Stuart Mcrae Craig FRSE, medical author
 Norman Davidson (biochemist), CBE
 Sir John Flett (geologist), KBE, FRSE, FRS, FGS
 Keith Moffatt, physicist
 Stan Paterson, glaciologist
 Ian R. Porteous, mathematician
 Gerald Russell, Professor of Psychiatry
 Leslie Skene, psychiatrist
 John Steele (oceanographer)
 Joseph Wedderburn, mathematician
 Ian Frazer, Creator of the Human Papilloma virus vaccine and Australian of the Year 2006

Sport
 Oliver Balfour, 45 international caps for squash
 Martin Bell, skier, and four times participant in the Winter Olympics
 Robin Chalmers, 54 international caps for squash
 Gillian Cooke, athlete and bobsledder
 James Cowan, cricketer
 Keith Fraser, Olympic Athlete 1992
 Ian Greig, cricketer
 Sir Chris Hoy, MBE, Six-time Olympic gold medal winning track cyclist
 Josh Kerr, 1500m bronze medalist at the 2020 Olympic Games
 Neil McCallum, cricketer
 Robin Smith, mountaineer
 Craig Sutherland, professional footballer
 Thomas Watt, cricketer

Rugby players
 Marcus Di Rollo
 Adam Hastings 
 Gavin Hastings, OBE, rugby player
 Scott Hastings, rugby player
 David Johnston International rugby player and professional footballer (Heart of Midlothian)
 Ian Robertson, rugby player and commentator
 Jason White, rugby player
 John Howard Wilson, rugby player

References 

Watsons, George